This list is of the Historic Sites of Japan located within the Prefecture of Ehime.

National Historic Sites
As of 1 July 2021, seventeen Sites have been designated as being of national significance.

Prefectural Historic Sites
As of 1 March 2021, forty-nine Sites have been designated as being of prefectural importance.

Municipal Historic Sites
As of 1 May 2020, a further three hundred and sixty-one Sites have been designated as being of municipal importance.

See also

 Cultural Properties of Japan
 Iyo Province
 Museum of Ehime History and Culture
 List of Cultural Properties of Japan - paintings (Ehime)
 List of Places of Scenic Beauty of Japan (Ehime)

References

External links
  Cultural Properties of Ehime Prefecture
  Historic Sites of Ehime Prefecture

Ehime Prefecture
 Ehime